Robert Milledge Charlton (January 19, 1807January 18, 1854) was an American politician and jurist.  He served as a Senator representing Georgia from 1852 to 1853.

Charlton was born in Savannah, Georgia, on January 19, 1807, to Thomas Charlton, future two-time mayor of Savannah, and Emily Walter. His mother died before he reached the age of two.  A lawyer by training, Charlton served in various positions at the city and state level in addition to his U.S. Senate term.  He was a member of the Georgia House of Representatives (1828), and he was appointed and subsequently elected a judge of the Eastern Circuit of Georgia in 1832. Charlton was also appointed as a United States District Attorney.

He was appointed as a Democrat to the United States Senate to fill the vacancy caused by the resignation of John M. Berrien. Charlton had previously served as the mayor of Savannah from 1839 to 1841. Charlton's father, Thomas Usher Pulaski Charlton, had previously served as the appointed mayor of Savannah in 1815 and again in 1819.

In 1829 Robert Charlton married Margaret Shick. Charlton ward, Savannah and Charlton County, Georgia are named after him. Charlton died in Savannah on January 18, 1854, the day before his 47th birthday, and is buried in Laurel Grove Cemetery in that city.

He was also a slave owner. In 1830, he owned 3 slaves. In 1840, he owned 14 slaves. In 1850, he owned 13 slaves.

References

External links

Chatham County GaArchives Biographies.....Charlton, Robert Milledge 1807 - 1854
Camden County, Georgia history
Live Oak Public Library list of mayors of Savannah, Georgia
Poems by Robert M. Charlton, and Thomas J. Charlton, M.D.; with an appendix, containing the Eulogy on Doctor Cumming, and a Historical Lecture on Sergeant Jasper by Robert M. Charlton
Letter, 1837 Apr. 17, Darien, Georgia to Governor William Schley, Milledgeville, Georgia, / Robert M. Charlton

1807 births
1854 deaths
Democratic Party members of the Georgia House of Representatives
Georgia (U.S. state) state court judges
Georgia (U.S. state) lawyers
Mayors of Savannah, Georgia
Democratic Party United States senators from Georgia (U.S. state)
American slave owners
United States Attorneys for the District of Georgia
19th-century American politicians
19th-century American judges
19th-century American lawyers
United States senators who owned slaves